Cynthia Layne (February 27, 1963 – January 18, 2015) was an American jazz and neo soul singer. Layne performed around the world singing in many styles. She signed with Indianapolis jazz label Owl Studios in 2006. She worked with Rob Dixon and Reggie Bishop.

She died of breast cancer at the age of 51 on January 18, 2015.

Discography
In Due Time (2001)
Reality (2004)
Beautiful Soul (Owl, 2007)

References

External links
 
 

African-American women singer-songwriters
American women jazz singers
American jazz singers
2015 deaths
Owl Studios artists
1963 births
21st-century African-American women singers